Oleksiy Andriyovich Potapenko (born 8 May 1981), known professionally as Potap, is a Ukrainian singer, rapper, songwriter and producer. He has been involved as a performer and/or producer of such iconic music acts as Potap i Nastya, Vremya i Steklo, MOZGI and many more, releasing over 300 songs, the vast majority of which became international hits.

Biography 
Oleksiy Potapenko was born on 8 May 1981 in Kyiv. His father, Andriy Potapenko (born 1956), served in the military. His mother, Lyudmila Potapenko (born 1958) is a world fin swimming race champion. Oleksii has been practicing swimming and water polo, where he received the title of Master of Sports.

He has earned two degrees. The first one is a PE instructor and water polo coach (National University of Ukraine on Physical Education and Sport). The second one is a Master of Economics, Entrepreneurship and Audit (Kyiv National Economic University).

Music career 
Between 2000 and 2006, Potapenko was performing as a part of a rap band called "VuZV" (Vhid u Zminnomu Vzutti – Re-shoe upon Entry). The song written by Potap "Na Svoey Volne" ("On its own") became the official soundtrack to a movie "Odin za vseh" ("One for all") while his other song co-written in collaboration with bands New'Z'Cool and XS became a main theme for an iconic horror movie produced in Ukraine, "Shtolna" ("The Adit").

In 2006 the artist teamed up with NK to create the duo "Potap & Nastya" where Oleksii acted as a producer, performer, songwriter, composer, video director and scriptwriter. The duo debuted with the song "Ne Para" ("Don't Match")  that turned into an international hit. In 2008, the duo released their debut album with the same title.

The artists released their second album titled "Ne Lubi Mne Mozgii" ("Don't Love my Brain") that included songs "Na Rayone" ("Down the neighbourhood"), "Novii God" ("New Year"), "Chipsi, Chicksi, Lavandos" ("Chips, Chicks and Money"). The most popular song on the album though was a hit with a name "Chumachechaya Vesna" ("Krazy Spring").

The duo kept moving towards new accomplishments, literally collecting wards one by one. Few years after the creation, the artist were already renowned with every single award on post-Soviet territories including: "Zolotoi Gramophon" ("Gold Gramophone Awards"), "Pesnya Goda" ("Song of the Year"), "RU.TV", "Premia Muz-TV" ("Muz TV Awards") and many more. Songs "Esli Vdrug tebya ne stanet" ("If you're suddenly gone") and "Mi Otmenyaem Konets Sveta" ("We Cancel the Apocalypse") played in the TV show "Dnevnik Doctora Zaytsevoy" (The Diary of Zaytseva M.D.").

In 2013 Potap & Nastya produced the third album "Vse Puchkom" ("Everything's Cool"). The song with the same title  received "Gold Gramophone" award and remained for a while on top of the most highly rated charts across countries along with another track from the album "Udi udi" ("Udi-udi").

The duo created by Oleksii and NK was officially the most popular touring duo in the country. The joint activity of the artists was followed by an incredible success and achievements as well as setting bars as high as no one have done it before. "Potap & Nastya" became awardees of various international music festivals owing over 50 rewards that include: "M1 Music Awards", "Song of the Year", "Gold Gromophone", "Muz TV Award", "Sharmanka" ("Music Box") and "RU.TV".  In 2017, the duo was recognized for "Contribution to the development of the National Scene".

In 2014 Oleksii launches the band MOZGI, where he acts as a producer, performer, songwriter, composer, director, scriptwriter till current days. Between 2015 and 2018 MOZGI was 5 times nominated for Yearly Ukrainian National Awards and 4 on M1 Music Awards winning twice in the latter one.

In 2014, Potap and Kamenskih were criticized in Ukraine for continuing to attend award ceremonies in Russia, while many Ukrainians believed their country was a victim of Russian aggression. On this they responded: "It's a shame that we have to collect the journalists to tell that we are from Ukraine and love our country!" In 2016 "Potap and Nastya" concerts were disrupted in Ukraine in protest of them continuing to tour in Russia.

In 2017, one of the most popular duos among Russian speaking communities worldwide announced the pause of their activity to start solo projects: PTP and NK respectively. The first solo album by PTP "Spelie Slivi EP" ("Ripe Plums EP") was released on 3 November 2017. Yet, Oleksii and Nastya's collaborative work wasn't over. Potap kept on writing songs for NK. With the support from his side NK presented such hits as "#etomoyanoch" ("#thatmytypeofnight"), co-written Ukrainian song "Trimay" ("Hold it"), "Dai Mne" ("Gimme"), international hit in Spanish and English "Peligroso" ("Dangerous"), LOMALA and "Popa Kak U Kim" ("Ass Like Kim's"). "Hold it" has taken over national top charts remaining on top for over the year and being recognized at YUNA Awards 2019 as a Pop Hit of the Year while Peligroso for 6 weeks remained in Billboard top charts under Tropical Songs ranking.

Production 
Today Potap is a head of "MOZGI Entertainment" – the label he established himself that is responsible for managing bands MOZGI, Vremia I Steklo (Time and Glass), singers Michelle Andrade and Ingret.

In 2012 MOZGI Entertainment launched a new branch MOZGI Production. The company gathered the best specialists on the market who previously were involved in making videos for Potap's artists development company. In 2019 a music video for song "Polube" ("Anyway") by MOZGI was nominated for Berlin Music Video Awards.

In 2015 music projects managed under MOZGI Entertainment participated in the following nominations: "Hit of the Year" (Vremya I Steklo – Imya 505 (Name 505) and Potap & Nastya – "Boomdiggibai" ("Boomdiggibai"), "Band of the Year" (Vremya I Steklo and Potap & Nastya), "Project of the Year": "MOZGI", Potap & Nastya feat. Bianca), "Music Video of the Year" (Vremya I Steklo – "Name 505", Potap & Nastya – "Boomdiggibai"). The awards were assigned the following way: "Hit of the Year" to Vremya I Steklo for "Name 505", while "Band of the Year" with top charts awards "Gold Gramophone" and M1 were given to Potap & Nastya. Moreover, that year Oleksii was renowned the Best Producer of the Year. The same year, a director Dimitri Archipovich, who worked цшер MOZGI Production at that time was announced the Best Director of the Cut.

Soundtracks 
In 2011 Oleksii Potapenko wrote the main theme song for the movie "Vikrutasi" ("Monkey Business"). The track performed by "Potap & Nastya" became the key element of the promo campaign to the movie.

In 2014 NK and Oleksii featured in an animated movie "The Seventh Dwarf". They also performed to soundtracks to the movie as well. One of those "Ver' v svoi sily" ("Believe in yourself") was greatly welcomed by the audience and gained an impressive airplay on the radio.

In 2018 a movie "Bezumnaya Svad'ba" ("Crazy Wedding") was released. Upon the release the movie set the record on box office sales among all Ukrainian premieres by collecting 50 664 000 UAH. Oleksii Potapenko not only featured in the movie, but wrote entirely wrote and produced an original motion soundtrack album that included 2 songs nominated for M1 Music Awards. Those are "Naikrashii Den'" ("The Best Day") performed together with Male Artist of the Year Oleg Vinnyk, and "Promin'" ("Gleam") written and performed in collaboration with all MOZGI Production stars".

Personal life 
Media and fans of the artist suggest that Oleksii is in love with his former duo partner NK.

On 23 May 2019, Potap and Nastya Kamenskih were married.

Television 
TV carrier of Oleksii Potapenko started with a TV-Show "Karaoke against People" on M1 Music Channel. For over ten years by now Oleksii, have actively participated in the most popular TV shows in Ukraine that include: The Voice of Ukraine and a comedy show Laughter League on the biggest channel in Ukraine 1+1. At both shows Potap is an honored judge and mentor who's been helping out a lot of emerging artists to unleash potential to the full.

The full list of shows, Oleksii has been involved at:
"Karaoke protiv naroda" (Karaoke Against People on M1) – TV host (2008–2009)
Guten Morgen (M1) – TV host (2009–2010)
Ya lublu Ukrainu (I Love Ukraine on 1+1) – TV host (2010)
 Superzveda (Superstar o 1+1) – a judge (2010)
Telezvezda (TV-star on TRK Ukraine) – TV host (2010)
15th Anniversary of 1+1 – TV host (2010)
"GPU" (1+1) – TV host (2010–2011)
Zvezda + Zvezda (Star + Star on 1+1) – a judge (2010–2011)
The Voice. Kids – mentor (2015–2016)
Liga Smeha (The Laughter League) – coach (2015–2018)
The Voice – mentor (2015–2020, 2022-)

Filmography 
2005 – Odin za vseh ("One for All")
2008 – Krasnaya Shapochka ("Little Red Riding Hood") – The Wolf
2010 – Novogodnie Svaty ("New Year's Matchmakers") – cameo
2011 – Nebesnie rodstvenniki ("Family from Heaven") – cameo
2012 – Rjevskii protiv Napaleona (Rjevsky versus Napoleon) – mob
2013 – 1+1 at home – cameo
2013 – Zaycev +1 – TV Host
 2018 – Bezumnaya Svad'ba (Crazy Wedding) – The Reverend Evlampii

Discography 
2004 – Potap – Na svoei volne ili ano kaneshno potomusho shojh ("On its own or it's just because")
2006 – Potap – Na drugoi volne ili ano kaneshno potomusho shojh ("On another frequency or it's just because")
2008 – Potap & Nastya – Nepara ("Not a Couple")
2009 – Potap & Nastya – Ne lubi mne mozgi ("Don't love my brains")
2013 – Potap & Nastya – Vse Puchkom ("Everything's Cool")
2015 – Potap & Nastya – Shchit I Myach ("Shield and ball")
2015 – Mozgi – Bikini Album
2015 – Mozgi – Elektroshaurma ("eDoner")
2016 – Mozgi –Bar
2017 – Mozgi – Na belom ("On white")
2017 – PTP – Spelie Slivi EP ("Ripe Plums EP")
2018 – Mozgi – Vinos mozga ("Brain explosion")

Music videos 

Potap -  Shivorot na vivorot ("Inside Out", 2005)
Potap – Na svoey Volne ("On its own", 2005)
Potap & Nastya – Bez Lubvi ("Without Love", 2006)
Potap & Nastya – Nepara ("Not a Couple", 2006)
Potap & Nastya – Krepkie Oreshki ("Hard Balls", 2007)
Potap & Nastya – Vnature ("Forreal", 2007)
Potap, dyadya Vadya, UGO – Natasha (2008)
Potap & Nastya – Razgulai ("Partyboy", 2008)
Potap & Nastya – Na rayone ("Down the neighborhood", 2008)
Potap, dyadya Vadya, UGO – Ya pomnu ("I remember", 2008)
Potap & Nastya – Pochemu ("Why", 2008)
Potap & Nastya – Ne lubi mne mozgi ("Don't love my brains", 2009)
Potap feat. New"Z"cool, dyadya Vadya, UGO – Kachaem ("Rockin'", 2009)
Potap & Nastya – Novii God ("New Year", 2009)
Potap & Nastya – Cry Me a River (2010)
Potap & Co – Leto ("Summer", 2010)
Potap & Co – More penitsa ("Sea Foaming", 2010)
Potap and Vera Brezhneva – Pronto (2010)
Potap & Nastya – Vikrutasi ("Monkey Business", 2011)
Potap & Nastya – Chumachechaya Vesna ("Krazy Spring", 2011)
Potap & Nastya – Mi Otmenaem konets sveta ("We cancel the apocalypse", 2011)
Potap & Nastya – Esli vdrug ("Just in case", 2011)
Arkady Laikin – Laiki ("Likes", 2012)
Potap & Nastya – Priletelo ("Flew in", 2012)
Potap & Nastya – Uletelo ("Flew out", 2012)
Potap & Nastya – Awesome Summer (2012)
Potap & Nastya – Lubov' so skidkoi ("Love with a discount", 2012)
Vremya I Steklo feat. Potap – Sleza ("A Tear", 2012)
Arkady Laikin feat Pozitiff – Seksualnii ("Sexy", 2013)
Arkady Laikin – Malimenya ("Begme", 2013)
Potap & Nastya – RuRuRu (2013)
Potap & Nastya – Vmeste ("Together", 2013)
Potap & Nastya – Vse Puchkom ("Everything's Cool", 2013)
Potap & Nastya – Udi-udi (2014)
Mozgi – Ayabo (2014)
Mozgi – Hlam ("Trash", 2014)
Mozgi – Nozhompo (2015)
Potap & Nastya – Bumdigibai (2015)
Mozgi – Hit moego leta ("Hit of my Summer", 2015)
Potap & Nastya feat. Bianka – Stil Sobachki ("Doggy Style", 2015)
Mozgi – Vertolet ("Helicopter", 2015)
Potap & Nastya – U mami ("At Mom's", 2016)
Potap & Nastya – Ya…ya ("Poisonous", 2017)
Mozgi – Atyatya (2017)
PTP feat. PZT – Malibu (2017)
Mozgi – Ale Ale ("Hello hello", 2018)
Mozgi – Vlazhni Plyazhnii Dvij (Wet Beach Grove, 2018)
Mozgi – Polube ("Anyways", 2018)
NK – Popa Kak U Kim ("Ass like Kim's", 2019)
Mozgi – Digitalization (2019)

Director 
Potap – Shivorot na vivorot ("Inside Out", 2005)
Potap – Na svoey Volne ("On its own", 2005)
David — Big Girl Now (2006)
Potap & Nastya – Bezz Lubvi ("Without Love", 2006)
Potap & Nastya – Nepara ("Not a Couple", 2006)
Queens & New'Z'Cool — Ozero Slyoz (Lake of tears, 2007)
Potap & Nastya – Krepkie Oreshki ("Hard Balls", 2007)
Potap & Nastya – Vnature ("Forreal", 2007)
Queens & New'Z'Cool — 5 element (2007)
Potap & Nastya – Razgulai ("Partyboy", 2008)
Queens& New'Z'Cool — Kto-to skazal mne (Somebody told me, 2008)
Potap & Nastya – Na rayone ("Down the neighborhood", 2008)
Potap & Nastya – Pochemu ("Why", 2008)
Potap & Nastya – Ne lubi mne mozgi ("Don't love my brains", 2009)
Potap feat. New"Z"cool, dyadya Vadya, UGO – Kachaem ("Rockin'", 2009)
Potap & Nastya – Novii God ("New Year", 2009)
Potap & Nastya – Cry Me a River (2010)
Potap & Co – Leto ("Summer", 2010)
Potap & Co – More penitsa ("Sea Foaming", 2010)
Potp & Nastya – "Chipsi, Chicksi, Lavandos" (Chips, Chicks and Money", 2010)
Potap and Vera Brezhneva – Pronto (2010)
Vremya i Steklo – Tak Vipala Karta ("It was meant by destiny", 2010)
Potap & Nastya – Vikrutasi ("Monkey Business", 2011)
Potap & Nastya – Chumachechaya Vesna ("Krazy Spring", 2011)
Potap & Nastya – Mi Otmenaem konets sveta ("We cancel the apocalypse", 2011)
Potap & Nastya – Esli vdrug ("Just in case", 2011)
Vremya i Steklo – Lubvi tochka net ("No love", 2011)
Vremya i Steklo – Serebryanoe More ("Silver sea", 2011)
Vremya i Steklo – Kafel' ("Tiles", 2011)
Arkady Laikin – Laiki ("Likes", 2012)
Niko Neman – Uletayu ("Flying away", 2012)
Vremya I Steklo feat. Potap – Sleza ("A Tear", 2012)
Potap & Nastya – RuRuRu (2013)
Arkady Laikin feat Pozitiff – Seksualnii ("Sexy", 2013)
Potap & Nastya – Vmeste ("Together", 2013)
Vremya I Steklo - #kAroche ("#kEeoitshort", 2013)
Aleksandr Kogan – Kto pridumal mir ("Who invented the world?", 2013)
Potap & Nastya – Udi-udi (2014)
Mozgi – Ayabo (2014)
Mozgi – Hlam ("Trash", 2014)
Zara – Schastie nad zemlei ("Happiness larger than the Earth", 2014)
Vremya I steklo – Imya 505 ("Name 505", 2015)
Vremya I steklo – Pesnya 404 ("Song 404", 2015)
Mozgi – Nozhompo (2015)
Potap & Nastya – Bumdigibai (2015)
Mozgi – Hit moego leta ("Hit of my Summer", 2015)
Potap & Nastya feat. Bianka – Stil Sobachki ("Doggy Style", 2015)
Mozgi – Vertolet ("Helicopter", 2015)
Vremya I Steklo – Naverno potomu chto ("Maybe Because", 2016)
Potap & Nastya – U mami ("At Mom's", 2016)
Potap & Nastya – Ya…ya ("Poisonous", 2017)
Vremya I Steklo – Na stile ("Stylish", 2017)
PTP feat. PZT – Malibu (2017)

References

External link 

1981 births
Living people
Musicians from Kyiv
National University of Ukraine on Physical Education and Sport alumni
Kyiv National Economic University alumni
Ukrainian pop singers
Ukrainian record producers
21st-century Ukrainian singers
Ukrainian rappers
Recipients of the title of Merited Artist of Ukraine
Mass media people from Kyiv
Winners of the Golden Gramophone Award